Offside is a 2006 Iranian film directed by Jafar Panahi, about a group of girls who tried to watch a World Cup qualifying match but are forbidden by law because of their gender. Female fans are not allowed to enter football stadiums in Iran on the grounds that there will be a high risk of violence or verbal abuse against them. The film was inspired by the director's daughter, who decided to attend a game anyway. The film was shot in Iran but its screening was banned there.

Plot 
Most of the characters in the film are not named.

A girl disguises herself as a boy to go attend the 2006 World Cup qualifying match between Iran and Bahrain. She travels by bus with a group of male fans, some of whom notice her gender, but do not tell anyone. Upon arrival at the grounds of Azadi Stadium, she persuades a reluctant ticket tout to sell her a ticket; he only agrees to do so at an inflated price. The girl tries to slip through security, but she is spotted and arrested. She is put in a holding pen on the stadium roof with several other women who have also been caught; the pen is frustratingly close to a window onto the match, but the women are at the wrong angle to see it.

The women are guarded by several soldiers, all of whom are just doing their national service; one in particular is an Iranian Azeri boy from Tabriz who just wants to return to his farm. The soldiers are bored and do not particularly care whether women should be allowed to attend football matches; however, they guard the women carefully for fear of their "chief", who could come by at any moment. They occasionally give commentary on the match to the women.

One of the younger girls needs to go to the toilet, but of course there is no women's toilet in the stadium. A soldier is deputed to escort her to the men's toilet, which he does by an increasingly farcical process: first disguising her face with a poster of a football star, then throwing a number of angry men out of the toilet and blockading any more from entering. During the chaos, the girl escapes into the stadium, although she returns to the holding pen shortly after as she is worried about the soldier from Tabriz getting into trouble.

Part of the way through the second half of the game, the women are bundled into a bus, along with a boy arrested for carrying fireworks, and the soldiers ordered to drive them to the Vice Squad headquarters. As the bus travels through Tehran, the soldier from Tabriz plays the radio commentary on the match as it concludes. Iran defeats Bahrain 1-0 with a goal from Mohammad Nosrati just after half time and wild celebrations erupt within the bus as the women and the soldiers cheer and sing with joy. The girl whose story began the film is the only one not happy. When asked why, she explains that she is not really interested in football; she wanted to attend the match because a friend of hers was one of seven people killed in a scuffle during the recent Iran–Japan match, and she wanted to see the match in his memory.

The city of Tehran explodes with festivity, and the bus becomes caught in a traffic jam as a spontaneous street party begins. Borrowing seven sparklers from the boy with the fireworks, the women and the soldiers leave the bus and join the party, holding the sparklers above them.

The film was filmed at an actual stadium during a qualifying match for the Iranian National team. Panahi had two separate outcomes to the film depending on the turnout of the match.

Cast 
 Sima Mobarak-Shahi as a female football fan
 Shayesteh Irani as a female football fan
 Ayda Sadeqi as a female football fan
 Golnaz Farmani as a female football fan
 Mahnaz Zabihi as a female soldier
 Nazanin Sediqzadeh as a young girl
 Hadi Saeedi as a soldier
 Mohsen Tanabandeh as the ticket seller

Reception 
The film received very positive reviews from critics. The review aggregator Rotten Tomatoes reported that 97% of critics gave the film positive reviews, based on 76 reviews. Metacritic reported the film had an average score of 85 out of 100, based on 25 reviews.

Top ten lists 
The film appeared on several critics' top ten lists of the best films of 2007.

First – Ed Gonzalez, Slant Magazine
2nd – Noel Murray, The A.V. Club
6th – J. Hoberman, The Village Voice
9th – Peter Rainer, The Christian Science Monitor
9th – Tasha Robinson, The A.V. Club

Awards 
The film won the Silver Bear at the Berlin International Film Festival in 2006, and was in the official selection for the 2006 New York and Toronto International Film Festivals.

References

External links 
Official site

The Azadi Stadium is at coordinates . Aerial images of the area also show the circular stairs shown in the movie, as the soldier takes the girl away.
 Offside: A film review

2006 films
2000s sports comedy films
Iranian satirical films
Films set in Iran
Films shot in Iran
Films directed by Jafar Panahi
Obscenity controversies in film
Sony Pictures Classics films
2000s Persian-language films
2000s feminist films
Sex segregation enforcement
Women's association football films
2000s satirical films
Silver Bear Grand Jury Prize winners
2006 comedy films
Censored films
Film censorship in Iran